Bill Hellmuth, AIA, LEED AP, is an American architect who has designed several notable projects worldwide. Since 2005, he has been president of HOK, a global architecture, engineering and planning firm, while also heading its Washington, D.C., office.

In April 2016, Hellmuth succeeded Patrick MacLeamy as HOK's CEO while continuing to serve as the firm's president and design principal in Washington, D.C.

Background
Hellmuth is a grandson of George F. Hellmuth, who started HOK's predecessor, Hellmuth, Yamasaki and Leinweber, in 1949.

Hellmuth received a Bachelor of Science (Architecture) degree from the University of Virginia, and, in 1977, a Master of Architecture from Princeton University, where he studied under Michael Graves. After leaving school, he joined Skidmore, Owings and Merrill.  In 1991, he joined HOK (the "Hellmuth" in HOK was his uncle), and became president of the firm in 2005.

As a longtime champion of sustainable design, Hellmuth began integrating sustainability into projects long before LEED certification became commonplace.

In 2014, Hellmuth was named a Senior Fellow of the Design Futures Council, an interdisciplinary network of design, product and construction leaders.

Projects
Projects that Hellmuth has designed include:
 Greenland Dalian East Harbor Tower, Dalian, China (108 stories)
 Abu Dhabi National Oil Company Headquarters, Abu Dhabi, UAE (74 stories)
 King Abdullah Petroleum Studies and Research Center (KAPSARC) Residential Community, Riyadh, Saudi Arabia
 DC Consolidated Forensic Laboratory, Washington, D.C. (LEED Platinum) 
 National Oceanic and Atmospheric Administration’s Center for Climate and Weather Prediction, Riverdale Park, Maryland
 Steven F. Udvar-Hazy Center, Chantilly, Virginia 
 The Collection at Chevy Chase, Chevy Chase, Maryland

Personal

Hellmuth is married and has two grown children.

References

External links
HOK website

Living people
21st-century American architects
University of Virginia School of Architecture alumni
Princeton University School of Architecture alumni
Year of birth missing (living people)
20th-century American architects